The 1956 Army Cadets football team represented the United States Military Academy in the 1956 NCAA University Division football season. In their 16th year under head coach Earl Blaik, the Cadets compiled a 5–3–1 record and outscored all opponents by a combined total of 223 to 153.  In the annual Army–Navy Game, the Cadets tied the Midshipmen by a 7 to 7 score. The Cadets also lost to Michigan, Syracuse, and Pittsburgh. 
 
Army guard Stan Slater was honored by the United Press as a third-team player on the 1956 College Football All-America Team.

Schedule

Roster

References

Army
Army Black Knights football seasons
Army Cadets football